The Trial of the Detectives (also known as the Turf Fraud Scandal) was a police corruption scandal involving three senior officers at Scotland Yard in 1877.

Scotland Yard was tasked with investigating a confidence trick carried out by Harry Benson and William Kurr, both Englishmen, who used horse racing bets to swindle £30,000 from Madame de Goncourt, a Parisian woman. The pursuit and capture of Benson and Kurr proved to be a complicated task as they always managed to stay one step ahead of the authorities. The subsequent investigation uncovered that Inspector John Meiklejohn had been accepting bribes from Kurr to provide advance warning of their impending arrest. Additionally, Chief Inspector Nathaniel Druscovich and Chief Inspector Palmer were implicated in this corrupt scheme.

The three stood trial at the Old Bailey and were sentenced to two years in prison. The incident had implications for the organisation of Scotland Yard, as the Superintendent's ability to supervise his subordinates was called into question. Following the Committee of Inquiry, the Detective Branch was reorganised into the CID.

References
Metropolitan Police Service History: Turf Fraud Scandal or the Trial of the Detectives. Accessed 15 April 2011.
 Meiklejohn, John, The Trial of the Detectives (C. Scribner's, 1928)

External links 

 

1877 in England
Scandals in England
1877 in case law
1877 in London
Corruption in England